Veloso Motorsport is a Portuguese auto racing team based in Póvoa de Lanhoso, Portugal. The team raced in the TCR International Series in 2015. Having previously raced in the SEAT León Eurocup & Spanish GT Championship amongst others.

TCR International Series

SEAT León Cup Racer (2015–)
After having raced in the SEAT León Eurocup in 2014, the team will enter the 2015 TCR International Series season with José Monroy and Francisco Mora driving an SEAT León Cup Racer each.

External links
 Veloso Motorsport official website

References

Portuguese auto racing teams
TCR International Series teams
International GT Open teams
British GT Championship teams
Auto racing teams established in 1991